The  European Conference of Reformed Churches (EUCRC) is a federation of churches Reformed Calvinists in Europe, formed in 2007. It is the European regional branch of the International Conference of Reformed Churches.

The organization's main objective is cooperation between Reformed churches for evangelism and theological education.

Member list 
As of December 24, 2021, the European Conference of Reformed Churches is made up of the following 8 members:
Christian Reformed Churches in the Netherlands
Evangelical Presbyterian Church in England and Wales
Evangelical Presbyterian Church in Ireland
Free Church of Scotland
Free Church of Scotland (Continuing)
Reformed Churches in the Netherlands (Liberated) (suspended since 2017)
Reformed Presbyterian Church of Ireland
Reformed Churches in Spain

Although not officially a member, the Evangelical Presbyterian Church of Ukraine and Ukrainian Evangelical Reformed Church are represented at CEIR meetings.

References

External links 
 website

International bodies of Reformed denominations